The 1970 Boston Red Sox season was the 70th season in the franchise's Major League Baseball history. The Red Sox finished third in the American League East with a record of 87 wins and 75 losses, 21 games behind the Baltimore Orioles, who went on to win the AL championship and the 1970 World Series.

Offseason 
 December 13, 1969: Dalton Jones was traded by the Red Sox to the Detroit Tigers for Tom Matchick.

Regular season 
The 1970s began with a new manager for the Red Sox. After the firing of Dick Williams near the end of the 1969 season, general manager Dick O'Connell reached down into the farm system again for a replacement and came up with Eddie Kasko, who had managed the Red Sox Triple-A farm team, the Louisville Colonels, to a second-place finish in 1969. Kasko had been a major league infielder from 1957 to 1966, with the St. Louis Cardinals, Cincinnati Reds, Houston Astros, and the Red Sox.

 Several other teams finished their season on October 1.

Kasko took over a team in transition in 1970. Its leading pitcher was Ray Culp, with 17 wins. Jim Lonborg, the superstar of 1967, still was not back in form and went 4–1. Carl Yastrzemski led the American League with a .329 batting average, and Tony Conigliaro appeared to have recovered from the horrible beaning of 1967, hitting .266, with 36 home runs and 116 RBIs. Reggie Smith hit .303, and George Scott had a banner year at .296, with 16 homers and 63 RBIs. Unfortunately, the Red Sox finished 21 games behind the rampaging Baltimore Orioles, who won 108 games and then went on to defeat the Cincinnati Reds in the 1970 World Series.

There were no scheduled doubleheaders this season at Fenway Park.

Season standings

Record vs. opponents

Notable transactions 
 May 28, 1970: Tom Matchick was traded by the Red Sox to the Kansas City Royals for Mike Fiore.
 July 14, 1970: Chuck Hartenstein was acquired by the Red Sox from the St. Louis Cardinals as part of a conditional deal.

Opening Day lineup 

Source:

Roster

Statistical leaders 

Source:

Batting 

Source:

Pitching 

Source:

Awards and honors 
Tony Conigliaro, Hutch Award

Farm system 

LEAGUE CHAMPIONS: Winston-Salem, Greenville

Source:

References

External links 
1970 Boston Red Sox team page at Baseball Reference
1970 Boston Red Sox season at baseball-almanac.com

Boston Red Sox seasons
Boston Red Sox
Boston Red Sox
Red Sox